Palmar venous arch may refer to:

 Deep palmar venous arch
 Superficial palmar venous arch